This is a list of marae (Māori meeting grounds) in the Waikato region of New Zealand.

In October 2020, the Government committed $13,896,659 from the Provincial Growth Fund to upgrade 53 marae in the region, with the intention of creating 363 jobs.

Waikato District

Hauraki District

Thames Coromandel District

Waipa District

Matamata-Piako District

South Waikato District

Taupo District

Otorohanga District

Waitomo District

See also
 Lists of marae in New Zealand
 List of schools in Waikato

References

Waikato, List of marae in
Marae
Marae in Waikato, List of